Acacia wardellii is a species of wattle native to Southeastern Queensland.

References

wardellii